Pogba is a surname. Notable people with the surname include the Pogba brothers, all professional footballers:

Florentin Pogba (born 1990)
Mathias Pogba (born 1990)
Paul Pogba (born 1993)

Surnames of African origin